Troy is a British television series which first started broadcasting on E4 on 11 February 2014. It is presented by magician Troy Von Scheibner, who performs magic to the public. It made its American debut on Syfy 13 January 2015.

On 15 December 2015, a special called Troy: Cyber Hijack was broadcast and featured Troy performing tricks and pranks involving technology.

Episodes

Series 1 (2014)

Series 2 (2015)
In September 2014, it was confirmed that a second series would be broadcast in 2015. It began on 8 March.

Broadcast
In Australia, the series premiered on GO! on 2 September 2015.

References

2014 British television series debuts
2015 British television series endings
British television magic series
Channel 4 original programming
Hidden camera television series
People from Lewisham
E4 (TV channel) original programming